NTS Sessions 1–4 (also known as NTS Sessions) is the thirteenth studio album by British electronic music duo Autechre, released by Warp on 26 April 2018. The album was announced on 9 April, and consists of original music comprising Autechre's April 2018 residency for NTS Radio, which was announced the week before, on 3 April 2018. The album was subsequently released in both digital and physical formats. Containing eight hours of music, NTS Sessions 1–4 is the longest Autechre release to date.  The album was met with critical acclaim.

Release and promotion
On 3 April 2018, the band announced a four-week residency on the online station NTS Radio, the broadcasts for which would occur on the 5th, 12th, 19th and 26th of that month at 4:00 PM GMT +1. It was not made known that the residency would include new material until after the first session was broadcast, leading many to assume that it would be another of the band's extended DJ mixes. A few days after the first session aired, Warp announced that each of the two-hour sessions would be released as a digital download immediately after broadcast, with 12-LP and 8-CD boxed sets of the entire album, as well as 3-LP pressings of each individual session, to be released in July, primarily through Bleep.com's Autechre store.

Composition and production
In an August 2018 interview with Pitchfork, Sean Booth and Rob Brown disclosed that they were initially disinclined to do a residency when approached by NTS, having produced a DJ set for the station in 2016. However, it subsequently occurred to the duo that they had enough material to fill eight hours, and they ultimately conceived of the project as an extended radio show. Like other Autechre releases of the past decade, the music is a product of what they refer to as "the system": "a labyrinthine compendium of software synthesizers, virtual machines, and digital processes." When asked how far back the material goes, Booth explained:

In approaching the project as a radio show, "tracks were put together and edited with that in mind", with "versions and repeats of ideas that have occurred in earlier material." The duo "spent ages sequencing" the album's component parts with an emphasis on "deep mixing ... where you've got things you aren't necessarily aware of at first listen."

Critical reception

NTS Sessions 1–4 has been met with critical acclaim. Mark Smith of Resident Advisor said that, although "NTS Sessions 1-4 will elicit the same critiques as any Autechre album in the last decade... it's their best record in many years", calling the album a "pinnacle, as if the preceding decades of work were acts of research leading to this point."  Andrew Nosnitsky of Pitchfork said that the album "adds another level of the British duo's legacy. Though it's created by a computer, it will bring you to another plane of human existence if you let it."

Reviewing the album for AllMusic upon its physical release, Paul Simpson concluded that "By nature, the daunting NTS Sessions is Autechre's most challenging work, but for those who are dedicated, it's also one of their most rewarding."

NTS Sessions 1–4 was ranked the 8th best release of the year in The Wire magazine's annual critics' poll.

Track listing

Notes
All versions of the album present the same material in the same order.  However, due to the limitations of physical media, the album's CD and vinyl versions spread the material across multiple discs, or records:
 Digitally, there are no gaps between songs. Some songs do segue into the next one, eg. "shimripl casual" and "all end".
 On CD, each Session is split between two discs, with eight total discs averaging an hour in length each. As it is not physically possible for songs from one disc to segue into the next disc, track times vary slightly around the middle of each session, as each disc presents the complete first or last few seconds of some of the songs. "wetgelis casual interval" and "all end" are merely seconds longer as a result, while "shimripl casual" gains nearly a full minute of runtime due to its long crossfade into "all end" on the digital version.
 On vinyl, each Session is split into three LPs, with 12 total records averaging 20 minutes per side of vinyl. Again, as seguing between sides of vinyl is not physically possible on its own, many sides feature a few extra seconds of some songs, eg. "debris_funk"'s final note decaying on its own instead of doing so overtop "l3 ctrl". For Session 4, "shimripl casual" is divided between two sides of vinyl, with the first four minutes on the second side and the rest on the third side; and album finale "all end" is split across the fourth through sixth sides. These parts fade in and out at the starts and ends of each vinyl side, respectively, and therefore feature a slight repetition of audio during the fading portions.
 Bonus track "sinistrail sentinel" was also made available through Adult Swim Singles.

Charts

References

External links
NTS Sessions on Autechre Store

2018 albums
Autechre albums
Warp (record label) albums
Albums with cover art by The Designers Republic